Fuller, Smith & Turner is a public limited company based in London, England. Its origins lie in John Fuller's Griffin Brewery, which dates from 1816. In 1845, John Fuller's son, John Bird Fuller, was joined by Henry Smith and John Turner to form the current company.

Fuller Smith & Turner was originally both a brewer and operator of a large chain of pubs, brewing its beer at Fuller's Brewery in Chiswick, West London. However, in January 2019 it sold its brewing division, comprising the Chiswick brewery as well as Cornish Orchards, Dark Star Brewing and Nectar Imports, to Asahi. Following the sale of the brewery, Fuller, Smith & Turner still own and operate over 380 pubs, inns, and hotels across the south of England, including 209 managed businesses and 175 tenanted inns. It has more than 820 boutique bedrooms in its managed estate and 44% of sites are within the M25.

The company's registered office is now on Strand-on-the-Green in Chiswick, London.

History
Beer has been brewed on Fuller's historic Griffin Brewery site in Chiswick since the seventeenth century. From the original brewery in the gardens of Bedford House on Chiswick Mall, the business expanded and thrived until the early part of the nineteenth century. Money problems forced the owners, Douglas and Henry Thompson and Philip Wood, to seek a partner. John Fuller, of Neston Park, Wiltshire was approached to see if he would inject the required amount of money. In 1829 he joined the enterprise, but the partnership proved a difficult one and in 1841 Douglas Thompson fled to France and the partnership was dissolved. It became apparent that it was difficult for one man with no brewing experience to run a brewery of that size alone. In 1845 John Fuller's son, John Bird Fuller, was joined by Henry Smith from the Romford Brewery of Ind & Smith and his brother-in-law, head brewer John Turner, thereby forming Fuller, Smith & Turner.

In June 2018, Fuller, Smith & Turner acquired Bel & The Dragon, which had six country inns in the South East.

In 2019, Fuller, Smith & Turner Plc sold their drinks company (The Fuller's Griffin Brewery, Cornish Orchards, Dark Star Brewery & Nectar Imports) to Asahi for £250m. Asahi stated that it would continue to brew beer at the Griffin brewery.

In October 2019, Fuller, Smith & Turner acquired Cotswold Inns & Hotels, comprising seven freehold country inns and hotels and eight freehold staff cottages in the Cotswolds, and two leasehold bars in Birmingham's city centre.

The Company previously owned The Stable, a craft cider and gourmet pizza restaurant business in England and Wales, which it sold in 2020.

See also
 Fuller's pubs

Notes

References

External links

1845 establishments in England
British companies established in 1845
Chiswick
Buildings and structures in Chiswick
Companies based in the London Borough of Hounslow
Companies listed on the London Stock Exchange
Food and drink companies established in 1845